Badister is a genus of ground beetle in the family Carabidae native to North Africa, the Near East and the Palearctic, including Europe.

In Ireland, Badister species are mostly confined to the south and west but no further north than midland counties, although the species number matches British and exceeds the Scandinavian totals.

Species
 Badister ajax Britton, 1948
 Badister anatolicus Schweiger, 1968
 Badister brevicollis Reiche, 1875
 Badister bucciarellii (Monguzzi, 1976)
 Badister bullatus Schrank, 1798
 Badister cavifrons Fauvel, 1903
 Badister collaris Motschulsky, 1844
 Badister denticulatus Wrase, 1995
 Badister dilatatus Chaudoir, 1837
 Badister dorsiger Duftschmid, 1812
 Badister elegans Leconte, 1880
 Badister fenestratus Semenov, 1906
 Badister ferrugineus Dejean, 1831
 Badister flavipes Leconte, 1853
 Badister fukiensis Jedlicka, 1956
 Badister gladiator Apfelbeck, 1904
 Badister grandiceps Casey, 1920
 Badister iranicus Jedlicka, 1961
 Badister iridescens Laferte-Senectere, 1851
 Badister ishigakiensis Habu, 1975
 Badister lacertosus Sturm, 1815
 Badister maculatus Leconte, 1853
 Badister mareei Burgeon, 1942
 Badister marginellus Bates, 1873
 Badister meridionalis Puel, 1925
 Badister micans Leconte, 1844
 Badister nakayamai Morita, 1992
 Badister naviauxi Wrase, 1995
 Badister neopulchellus Lindroth, 1954
 Badister nigriceps A. Morawitz, 1863
 Badister notatus Haldeman, 1843
 Badister obtusus Leconte, 1878
 Badister parviceps Ball, 1959
 Badister peltatus Panzer, 1796
 Badister pictus Bates, 1873
 Badister promontorii Peringuey, 1896
 Badister pulchellus Leconte, 1848
 Badister reflexus Leconte, 1880
 Badister sasajii Morita, 2001
 Badister seriepunctatus Peyron, 1858
 Badister sodalis Duftschmid, 1812
 Badister submarinus Motschulsky, 1859
 Badister sundaicus Andrewes, 1926
 Badister thoracicus Wiedemann, 1823
 Badister transversus Casey, 1920
 Badister unipustulatus Bonelli, 1813
 Badister ussuriensis Jedlicka, 1937
 Badister vandykei Ball, 1959
 Badister vittatus Bates, 1873

References

External links
Badister at Fauna Europaea

Licininae